The following is a list of Union Army regiments raised in South Carolina during the American Civil War. Only African-American units were raised in the state. Four complete regiments were organized and mustered into service; Union authorities planned to raise a fifth regiment but instead transferred the recruits to the other regiments. The list of South Carolina Confederate Civil War units is shown separately.

Infantry
1st Regiment South Carolina Volunteer Infantry (African Descent) – later 33rd United States Colored Infantry Regiment
2nd Regiment South Carolina Volunteer Infantry (African Descent) – later 34th United States Colored Infantry Regiment
3rd Regiment South Carolina Volunteer Infantry (African Descent) – later 21st United States Colored Infantry Regiment
4th Regiment South Carolina Volunteer Infantry (African Descent) – later 21st United States Colored Infantry Regiment
5th Regiment South Carolina Volunteer Infantry (African Descent) – failed to complete organization, men transferred to 3rd and 4th Regiments

See also
 Lists of American Civil War Regiments by State
 United States Colored Troops

References
 Dyer, Frederick H. (1959). A Compendium of the War of the Rebellion. New York and London. Thomas Yoseloff, Publisher. 
The Civil War Archive

 
South Carolina
Civil War